Clay Serby is a Canadian former politician in Saskatchewan. He previously served as the province's deputy premier and Minister of Regional Economic and Co-operative Development. On September 7, 2007 he announced that he would not be running in the 2007 provincial election.  

Saskatchewan New Democratic Party MLAs
Living people
Deputy premiers of Saskatchewan
Members of the Executive Council of Saskatchewan
1950 births
20th-century Canadian politicians
21st-century Canadian politicians